List of Goan Brahmin Communities

Goud Saraswat Brahmins
Kudaldeshkar Gaud Brahmin 
Rajapur Saraswat Brahmins 
Karhade Brahmins 
Chitpawan

Brahmin communities of Goa
Konkani